With the exception of South Africa and Cape Verde, lesbian, gay, bisexual, and transgender (LGBT) rights in Africa are limited in comparison to the United States, Canada, Western Europe, Australia, and New Zealand.
Out of the 55 states recognised by the United Nations or African Union or both, the International Gay and Lesbian Association stated in 2015 that homosexuality is outlawed in 34 African countries. Human Rights Watch notes that another two countries, Benin and the Central African Republic, do not outlaw homosexuality, but have certain laws which discriminate against homosexual individuals. Many of the laws that criminalize homosexuality are colonial-era laws.

Homosexuality has never been criminalised in Benin, Burkina Faso, Central African Republic, Djibouti, Ivory Coast, Democratic Republic of the Congo, Republic of the Congo, Equatorial Guinea, Madagascar, Mali, Niger, and Rwanda. It has been decriminalised in Angola, Botswana, Cape Verde, Gabon, Guinea-Bissau, Lesotho, Mozambique, São Tomé and Príncipe, the Seychelles and South Africa. South Africa was the fifth country in the world to legalize same-sex marriage in November of 2006. LGBT anti-discrimination laws exist in seven African countries: Angola, Botswana, Cape Verde, Mauritius, Mozambique, Seychelles, and South Africa. While governments are increasingly enforcing the law, many legislators have recently proposed stricter sentences for same-sex activity. From 2009 and 2014, Uganda's Anti-Homosexuality Act, which in its original form would have allowed the death sentence for some same-sex crimes, attracted international attention. 

Since 2011, some developed countries have been considering or implementing laws that limit or prohibit general budget support to countries that restrict the rights of LGBT people. In spite of this, many African countries have refused to consider increasing LGBT rights, and in some cases have drafted laws to increase sanctions against LGBT people. Past African leaders such as Zimbabwe’s Robert Mugabe and Uganda’s Yoweri Museveni claimed that LGBT behaviour was brought into the continent from other parts of the world. Nevertheless, most scholarship and research demonstrates that homosexuality has long been a part of various African cultures.

In a 2011 UN General Assembly declaration for LGBT rights, state parties were given a chance to express their support, opposition or abstention on the topic. Only Cape Verde, Central African Republic, Gabon, Guinea-Bissau, Mauritius, Rwanda, São Tomé and Príncipe, Seychelles, Sierra Leone, and South Africa expressed their support. Majority of the African countries expressed their opposition. State parties that expressed abstention were Angola, Botswana, Burkina Faso, Burundi, Democratic Republic of the Congo, Equatorial Guinea, Ghana, Lesotho, Liberia, Madagascar, Mozambique, Namibia, Republic of the Congo, and Zambia.

In southern Somalia, Somaliland, Mauritania and northern Nigeria, homosexuality is punishable by death. In Sudan, Gambia, Uganda, Tanzania, and Sierra Leone, offenders can receive life imprisonment for homosexual acts, although the law is not enforced in Sierra Leone. In addition to criminalizing homosexuality, Nigeria has enacted legislation that would make it illegal for heterosexual family members, allies and friends of LGBT people to be supportive. According to Nigerian law, a heterosexual ally "who administers, witnesses, abets or aids" any form of gender non-conforming and homosexual activity could receive a 10-year jail sentence. 

The Republic of South Africa has the most liberal attitudes toward gays and lesbians, as the country has legalized same-sex marriage and its Constitution guarantees gay and lesbian rights and protections. South Africa is the only country in Africa where any form of discrimination against the LGBT community is constitutionally forbidden. In 2006, South Africa became the first country in Africa and the fifth in the world to enact same-sex marriage.  Discrimination is, however, far rarer in bigger cities, and there are large LGBT communities in cities like Johannesburg, Cape Town, Durban, Pretoria, Port Elizabeth,  East London, Bloemfontein, Nelspruit, Pietermaritzburg, Kimberley and George. South Africa's three largest cities, Johannesburg, Durban and Cape Town, are considered fairly accepting of the LGBT community and are promoted as tourist destinations for LGBT people. However, despite legal recognition, social discrimination against South African LGBT people does still occur, particularly in rural areas, where it is fueled by a number of religious figures and traditions. Spanish, Portuguese, British and French territories legalised same-sex marriages.

Travel advisories encourage gay and lesbian travelers to use discretion whilst in Africa to ensure their personal safety, including by avoiding public displays of affection (advice which applies to both homosexual and heterosexual couples). South Africa is generally considered to be the most gay-friendly African country in respect of the legal status of LGBT rights, although Cape Verde is also frequently regarded as being very socially accepting of LGBT rights.

History of male homosexuality in Africa

Ancient history

Egypt

It remains unclear what view the ancient Egyptians fostered about homosexuality. Any document and literature that actually contains sexually oriented stories never names the nature of the sexual deeds but instead uses stilted and flowery paraphrases. Ancient Egyptian documents never clearly say that same-sex relationships were seen as reprehensible or despicable. No ancient Egyptian document mentions that homosexual acts were set under penalty. Thus, a straight evaluation remains problematic.

The best-known case of possible homosexuality in ancient Egypt is that of the two high officials Nyankh-Khnum and Khnum-hotep. Both men lived and served under pharaoh Niuserre during the 5th Dynasty (c. 2494–2345 BC). Nyankh-Khnum and Khnum-hotep each had families of their own with children and wives, but when they died their families apparently decided to bury them together in one and the same mastaba tomb. In this mastaba, several paintings depict both men embracing each other and touching their faces nose-on-nose. These depictions leave plenty of room for speculation, because in ancient Egypt the nose-on-nose touching normally represented a kiss.

Egyptologists and historians disagree about how to interpret the paintings of Nyankh-khnum and Khnum-hotep. Some scholars believe that the paintings reflect an example of homosexuality between two married men and prove that the ancient Egyptians accepted same-sex relationships. Other scholars disagree and interpret the scenes as an evidence that Nyankh-khnum and Khnum-hotep were twins, even possibly conjoined twins. No matter what interpretation is correct, the paintings show at the very least that Nyankh-khnum and Khnum-hotep must have been very close to each other in life as in death.

The Roman Emperor Constantine in the 4th century AD is said to have exterminated a large number of "effeminate priests" based in Alexandria.

Modern history

North Africa
North Africa contained some of the most visible and well-documented traditions of homosexuality in the world – particularly during the period of Mamluk rule. Arabic poetry emerging from cosmopolitan and literate societies frequently described the pleasures of pederastic relationships. There are accounts of Christian boys being sent from Europe to become sex workers in Egypt. In Cairo, cross-dressing men called "khawal" would entertain audiences with song and dance (potentially of pre-Islamic origin).

The Siwa Oasis in Egypt was described by several early twentieth century travellers as a place where same-sex sexual relationships were quite common. A group of warriors in this area were known for paying reverse dowries to younger men; a practice that was outlawed in the 1940s.

Siegfried Frederick Nadel wrote about the Nuba tribes in Sudan the late 1930s. He noted that among the Otoro, a special transvestitic role existed whereby men dressed and lived as women. Transvestitic homosexuality also existed amongst the Moru, Nyima, and Tira people, and reported marriages of Korongo londo and Mesakin tubele for the bride price of one goat. In the Korongo and Mesakin tribes, Nadel reported a common reluctance among men to abandon the pleasure of all-male camp life for the fetters of permanent settlement.

East Africa
Gender-nonconforming and homosexuality has been reported in a number of East African societies. In pre-colonial East Africa there have been examples of male priests in traditional religions dressing as women. British social anthropologist Rodney Needham has described such a religious leadership role called "mugawe" among the Meru people and Kikuyu people of Kenya, which included wearing women's clothes and hairstyle. Mugawe are frequently homosexual, and sometimes are formally married to a man.

Such men were known as "ikihindu" among the Hutu and Tutsi peoples of Burundi and Rwanda. A similar role is played by some men within the Swahili-speaking Mashoga—who often take on women's names and cook and clean for their husbands.

Ethiopia
In Ethiopian history, the recognition of same-sex activity is generally obscure, which means no rare evidence left to scholarly research. However, The Life and Struggles of Our Mother Wälättä P̣eṭros (1672) is the first reference of homosexuality between nuns in Ethiopian literature. Homosexuality, meanwhile, was faded out through much of its history until in Meles Zenawi administration in 2008, followed by rapid growth of communal upheaval in the country into suppression. However with negative public attitude and legal codification in Constitution's Article 629, same-sex activity is criminalized up to 15 years life imprisonment.

According to 2007 Pew Research Center, 97% of Ethiopians said that homosexuality is the way of life that society should not accept, becoming the highest level of rejection after Mali. The Ethiopian Orthodox Tewahedo Church  plays a significant role in maintaining society against homosexuality, and some members form anti-gay movements. One of them is "Zim Anlem" founded by Dereje Negash, who strongly affiliated with the Church.

Among the Maale people of southern Ethiopia, historian Donald Donham documented "a small minority [of men] crossed over to feminine roles. Called "ashtime", these (biological) males dressed like women, performed female tasks, cared for their own houses, and apparently had sexual relations with men". They were also protected by the king.

Uganda
In Uganda, religious roles for cross-dressing men (homosexual priests) were historically found among the Bunyoro people. Similarly, the kingdom of Buganda (part of modern-day Uganda) institutionalized certain forms of same-sex relations. Young men served in the royal courts and provided sexual services for visitors and elites. King Mwanga II of Buganda had several such men executed when they converted to Christianity and refused to carry out their assigned duties (the "Uganda Martyrs"). The Teso people of Uganda also have a category of men who dress as women.

Kenya
Swedish anthropologist Felix Bryk reported active (i.e., insertive) Kikuyu pederasts called onek, and also mentioned "homo-erotic bachelors" among the pastoralist Nandi and Maragoli (Wanga). The Nandi as well as the Maasai would sometimes cross-dress as women during initiation ceremonies.

West Africa
The Dagaaba people, who lived in Burkina Faso, believed that homosexual men were able to mediate between the spirit and human worlds. They also believed that gender was based on the energy of a person rather than that of anatomy.

Southern Africa

Writing in the 19th century about the area of today's southwestern Zimbabwe, David Livingstone asserted that the monopolization of women by elderly chiefs was essentially responsible for the "immorality" practised by younger men. Edwin W. Smith and A. Murray Dale mention one Ila-speaking man who dressed as a woman, did women's work, lived and slept among, but not with, women. The Ila label "mwaami" they translated as "prophet". They also mentioned that pederasty was not rare, "but was considered dangerous because of the risk that the boy will become pregnant".
 
Marc Epprecht's review of 250 court cases from 1892 to 1923 found cases from the beginnings of the records. The five 1892 cases all involved black Africans. A defense offered was that "sodomy" was part of local "custom". In one case a chief was summoned to testify about customary penalties and reported that the penalty was a fine of one cow, which was less than the penalty for adultery. Over the entire period, Epprecht found the balance of black and white defendants proportional to that in the population. He notes, however, only what came to the attention of the courts—most consensual relations in private did not necessarily provoke notice. Some cases were brought by partners who had been dropped or who had not received promised compensation from their former sexual partner. And although the norm was for the younger male to lie supine and not show any enjoyment, let alone expect any sexual mutuality, Epprecht found a case in which a pair of black males had stopped their sexual relationship out of fear of pregnancy, but one wanted to resume taking turns penetrating each other.

Legislation by country or territory

Public opinion

Views of African leaders on homosexuality

The former president of Zimbabwe, Robert Mugabe, was uncompromising in his opposition to LGBT rights in Zimbabwe. In September 1995, Zimbabwe's parliament introduced legislation banning homosexual acts. In 1997, a court found Canaan Banana, Mugabe's predecessor and the first President of Zimbabwe, guilty of 11 counts of sodomy and indecent assault. Mugabe has previously referred to LGBT people as being "worse than dogs and pigs".

In the Gambia, former President Yahya Jammeh led the call for legislation that would set laws against homosexuals that would be "stricter than those in Iran", and that he would "cut off the head" of any gay or lesbian person discovered in the country. News reports indicated his government intended to execute all homosexuals in the country. In the speech given in Tallinding, Jammeh gave a "final ultimatum" to any gays or lesbians in the Gambia to leave the country. In a speech to the United Nations on 27 September 2013, Jammeh said that "[h]omosexuality in all its forms and manifestations which, though very evil, antihuman as well as anti-Allah, is being promoted as a human right by some powers", and that those who do so "want to put an end to human existence". In 2014, Jammeh called homosexuals "vermins" by saying that "We will fight these vermins called homosexuals or gays the same way we are fighting malaria-causing mosquitoes, if not more aggressively". He also went on to disparage LGBT people by saying that "As far as I am concerned, LGBT can only stand for Leprosy, Gonorrhoea, Bacteria and Tuberculosis; all of which are detrimental to human existence". In 2015, in defiance of western criticism Jammeh intensified his anti-gay rhetoric, telling a crowd during an agricultural tour: "If you do it [in the Gambia] I will slit your throat—if you are a man and want to marry another man in this country and we catch you, no one will ever set eyes on you again, and no white person can do anything about it."

In Uganda there have been recent efforts to institute the death penalty for homosexuality. British newspaper The Guardian reported that President Yoweri Museveni "appeared to add his backing" to the legislative effort by, among other things, claiming "European homosexuals are recruiting in Africa", and saying gay relationships were against God's will. In a 2014 interview with CNN, Museveni described homosexuals as "disgusting", saying that their acts are "unnatural" and that he would be able to ignore them if it was proven that "[he] is born that way". He also said that he had appointed a group of scientists in Uganda to determine if homosexuality was a learned orientation. This led to widespread criticism from the scientific community, with an academic of the National Institutes of Health calling on his Ugandan counterparts to reconsider their findings.

Abune Paulos, the late Patriarch of the ancient Ethiopian Orthodox Church, which has a very strong influence in Christian Ethiopia, stated homosexuality is an animal-like behavior that must be punished.

Chad in 2017 passed a law criminalizing sodomy. Previously, the country never had any laws against consensual same-sex activity. Conversely, some African states like Lesotho, São Tomé and Príncipe, Mozambique, the Seychelles, Angola, and Botswana have abolished sodomy laws in recent years. Legalization is proposed in  some African states like Eswatini, Kenya, Mauritius, Namibia, Togo, Zambia. Gabon passed a law criminalizing sodomy in 2019 and reversed its decision by once again decriminalizing homosexuality a year later in 2020.

Marriage

Adoption

Homosexuals as neighbours

See also

 Recognition of same-sex unions in Africa
Human rights in Africa
Coalition of African Lesbians
LGBT rights by country or territory
LGBT rights in Europe
LGBT rights in the Americas
LGBT rights in Asia
LGBT rights in Oceania

Notes

References

Further reading

External links

African Veil – African LGBT site with news articles
Africans and Arabs come out online, Reuters via Television New Zealand
Signare Bi Sukugn Afroqueer Reporter
Behind the Mask, LGBT Magazine in Africa
Coalition of African Lesbians
Pink & Black magazine
LGBT Stories from Afrol
Morality of Homosexuality – Acceptance rate per country